Antonio Jose Hechanova Caram (born January 14, 1991) is a Filipino professional basketball player for the Meralco Bolts of the Philippine Basketball Association (PBA). He was drafted in the third round (26th overall) in the 2013 PBA draft by the Bolts.

College career 
Caram played college basketball for San Beda Red Lions where he helped the team to win the NCAA Philippines Basketball Championship for four out of his five years in college.

Professional career

Meralco Bolts (2013–present) 
In 2013, Caram was drafted by Meralco Bolts of the Philippine Basketball Association (PBA). In the 2013-14 Philippine Cup, he finished with seven points, three rebounds and three assists, plus a late three-pointer in the fourth that iced the win for Meralco against the Alaska Aces. 

In the 2017-18 Philippine Cup, Caram had 16 points in their first game against Barangay Ginebra since their Finals series, where Meralco lost.

In the 2019 Governors' Cup, he became the shortest player to score 30 points in a game, with 16 of those points coming in the fourth quarter. For that performance, he was named Player of the Week. Following that conference, he was signed to a two-year extension.

During the 2023 Governors' Cup, Caram had a season-high 18 points in a win over the Terrafirma Dyip.

PBA career statistics

As of the end of 2021 season

Season-by-season averages 

|-
| align=left | 
| align=left | Meralco
| 22 || 13.6 || .308 || .267 || .708 || .9 || 1.5 || .3 || .0 || 2.8
|-
| align=left | 
| align=left | Meralco
| 23 || 12.6 || .358 || .160 || .875 || 1.3 || 1.0 || .4 || .1 || 3.0
|-
| align=left | 
| align=left | Meralco
| 35 || 12.6 || .449 || .250 || .550 || .9 || 1.3 || .6 || .0 || 3.4
|-
| align=left | 
| align=left | Meralco
| 44 || 11.5 || .414 || .500 || .667 || 1.0 || 1.0 || .3 || .0 || 3.3
|-
| align=left | 
| align=left | Meralco
| 41 || 18.6 || .476 || .170 || .813 || 1.3 || 1.4 || .5 || .1 || 6.3
|-
| align=left | 
| align=left | Meralco
| 40 || 13.5 || .428 || .297 || .762 || 1.0 || 1.3 || .4 || .1 || 4.1
|-
| align=left | 
| align=left | Meralco
| 10 || 5.0 || .500 || .000 || – || .3 || .2 || .0 || .0 || 1.2
|-
| align=left | 
| align=left | Meralco
| 34 || 14.1 || .424 || .321 || .667 || .9 || 1.4 || .3 || .0 || 4.0
|-class=sortbottom
| align=center colspan=2 | Career
| 249 || 13.5 || .426 || .271 || .719 || 1.0 || 1.2 || .4 || .0 || 3.9

Player profile 
Although Caram is mostly a bench player for the Bolts and averages around 4 points a game, he has established himself as one of the team's top perimeter defenders and was hailed by teammate and Philippine national team legend Jimmy Alapag as "one of the best on-ball defenders" in the league. With his decision-making and passing, he can start games whenever a teammate is injured.

References 

1991 births
Living people
Basketball players from Iloilo
Filipino men's basketball players
Meralco Bolts players
San Beda Red Lions basketball players
Point guards
Sportspeople from Iloilo City
Visayan people
Meralco Bolts draft picks